Ortalidina is a genus of flies in the family Chamaemyiidae.

Species
O. cellularis Blanchard, 1852

References

Chamaemyiidae
Lauxanioidea genera